A microactuator is a microscopic servomechanism that supplies and transmits a measured amount of energy for the operation of another mechanism or system. As a general actuator, following standards have to be met:
 Large travel
 High precision
 Fast switching
 Low power consumption
 Power free force sustainability
For microactuator, there are two in addition
 Microstructurability
 Integrability

Principle of microactuators
The basic principle can be described as the expression for mechanical work
 
since an actuator is to manipulate positions and therefore force is needed. For different kind of microactuators, different physical principles are applied.

Classes of microactuators
Electrostatic
Electromagnetic
Piezoelectric
Fluid
Thermal

See also
Newton's laws
Euler–Bernoulli beam equation
Electrostatics
Electromagnetism
Piezoelectricity
Microfluidics
Sensors
Nanotube nanomotor

Microtechnology
Actuators